The Frank Skinner Show is a television chat show hosted by comedian Frank Skinner, which lasted nine series on British television between 1995 and 2005.

As well as celebrity interviews, the shows includes an initial stand-up routine, various sketches throughout the episode and usually concludes with a comedic song featuring Skinner and the guest stars. The Frank Skinner Show became notorious over the years for the unconventional nature of the interviews, including some shocking revelations from the guests.

It was screened on BBC One from its first episode on 10 September 1995 until 3 June 1999.

In 2000, the show moved to ITV. The programme was nominated for a Royal Television Society Award in 2001.

Series guide

Series 1 (1995–96)

Series 2 (1997–98)

Series 3 (1999)

Series 4 (2000)

Series 5 (2001–02)

Series 6 (2002)

Series 7 (2003)

Series 8 (2004)

Series 9 (2005)

References

External links
 

1995 British television series debuts
2005 British television series endings
1990s British comedy television series
2000s British comedy television series
1990s British television talk shows
2000s British television talk shows
BBC television comedy
ITV comedy
British television talk shows
Television series by ITV Studios
BBC television talk shows